The All People Front was an electoral coalition formed between the Communist Party of Greece, the Common Front of Workers, Farmers and Professionals and the United Front of Workers and Peasants. It participated in the elections of 1935 as Communists and Allies and took 9,59% without electing any MPs.

Before the elections of 1936, the Agricultural Party of Greece and several independent left-wing personalities entered the coalition in order to contest the 1936 Greek legislative election. The All People Front took 5.76% of the vote and won 15 seats.

Election results

Hellenic Parliament

A 1935 results compared to the KKE totals in the 1933 election.

Footnotes

1935 establishments in Greece
1936 disestablishments in Greece
Communist Party of Greece
Defunct left-wing political party alliances
Defunct political party alliances in Greece
Defunct socialist parties in Greece
History of Greece (1924–1941)
Political parties disestablished in 1936
Political parties established in 1935
United fronts